Ugocsa was an administrative county (comitatus) of the Kingdom of Hungary. Its territory is now in north-western Romania and western Ukraine. The capital of the county was Nagyszőllős (now Vynohradiv,  Ukraine).

Geography

Ugocsa county shared borders with the Hungarian counties Máramaros, Szatmár and Bereg. It was situated on both sides of the river Tisza. Its area was 1208 km around 1910.

History
In 1920, by the Treaty of Trianon most of the county (including Nagyszőllős) became part of newly formed Czechoslovakia, while a very little part remained in Hungary were joined to Szatmár County, which was merged to Szatmár-Ugocsa-Bereg County in 1923. The southern part – including Halmi (today Halmeu) – became part of Romania. In 1938, the western part of the former Czechoslovak part was returned to Hungary by the First Vienna Award, which became part of the newly formed Bereg-Ugocsa County – as Szatmár County was recreated – but shortly in 1939 the rest became part of Hungary again as the remainder of Carpathian Ruthenia was annexed after Czechoslovakia ceased to exist. These part were assigned to the administrative branch offices of Máramaros. In 1940, by the Second Vienna Award the southern part as well returned to Hungary thus the county was recreated with a modified territory, with the parts also included earlier to the administrative branch offices of Máramaros. The capital again became Nagyszőllős.

After World War II, the formerly Czechoslovak part of Ugocsa county became part of the Soviet Union, Ukrainian SSR, Zakarpattia Oblast. Since 1991, when the Soviet Union split up, the Zakarpattia Oblast has been part of Ukraine. The southern part of the county became part of Romania again and is now part of the Romanian county Satu Mare.

Demographics

Subdivisions

In the early 20th century, the subdivisions of Ugocsa county were:

Vynohradiv is now in Ukraine; Halmeu is now in Romania.

References

Notes

States and territories established in 1790
States and territories established in 1860
States and territories established in 1940
States and territories disestablished in 1785
States and territories disestablished in 1850
States and territories disestablished in 1920
States and territories disestablished in 1923
States and territories disestablished in 1945
Counties in the Kingdom of Hungary
Maramureș